Rugby da Universidade de Aveiro is a rugby team based in Aveiro, Portugal. As of the 2012/13 season, they play in the Second Division of the Campeonato Nacional de Rugby (National Championship). The club is the official rugby team of the University of Aveiro.

External links
Rugby da Universidade de Aveiro

Universidade de Aveiro, Rugby da
Sport in Aveiro, Portugal